The 1994 All-Ireland Senior Club Camogie Championship for the leading clubs in the women's team field sport of camogie was won by Lisdowney, who defeated Glen Rovers in the final, played at Ballyragget, after one of the most spectacular comebacks in the history of Gaelic Games,.

Arrangements
The championship was organised on the traditional provincial system used in Gaelic Games since the 1880s, with Dunloy and Pearses winning the championships of the other two provinces. Marina Downey scored 4–5 and Angela Downey 3–6 in Lisdowney's semi-final victory over Dunloy, while Sinéad McMullan (1–2) and Majella McMullan (1–1) scored for Dunloy. Glen Rovers goalkeeper Máiread O'Leary helped secure their place in the final, with a series of reflex saves against Pearses.

The Final
Angela Downey scored four goals for Lisdowney in her last club final appearance, helping Lisdowney back from an astonishing ten points down. Glen led by 1–10 to 0–6 at half time.

Final stages

References

External links
 Camogie Association

1994 in camogie
1994